Woseribre Senebkay (alternatively Seneb Kay) was an ancient Egyptian pharaoh during the Second Intermediate Period. The discovery of his tomb in January 2014 supports the existence of an independent Abydos Dynasty, contemporary with the Fifteenth and Sixteenth Dynasties during the Second Intermediate Period.

Attestation
He might also appear in the Turin Canon, where there appear two kings with the throne name "Weser... re" (the names are only partly preserved). A further possible object with his name is a magical wand bearing the name Sebkay. The wand was found at Abydos but could refer to one or possibly two kings of the earlier 13th Dynasty. The existence of the so-called Abydos Dynasty was first proposed by Detlef Franke and later further developed by Kim Ryholt in 1997.

Death
The Skeleton of Senebkay show he died at the age of 35-40 from multiple battlewounds.

Tomb

Senebkay's tomb (CS9) was discovered in 2014 by Josef W. Wegner of the University of Pennsylvania and a team of Egyptian archaeologists in the southern part of Abydos, Egypt. The four-chamber tomb has a decorated limestone burial chamber. Most blocks of the chamber were reused from older structures, such as the stela of Idudju-iker. On the east, short wall there is a painted depiction of the two Wadjet-eyes. Left and right are standing the goddess Neith and Nut. Over the scene is depicted a winged sun disc. On the North wall is depicted a standing goddess; her name is destroyed. There are short text lines mentioning the deities Duamutef and Qebehsenuf. In the center of the wall appears the cartouche with the king's name Senebkay. The South wall is much destroyed. There are visible the remains of two female deities. Texts mention the deities Amset and Hapi. The head of the king was once decorated with a mummy mask. The texts record the pharaoh's titulary and call him the "king of Upper and Lower Egypt, Woseribre, the son of Re, Senebkay". Senebkay's name was found inscribed inside a royal cartouche. Some of the burial equipment, such as the wooden canopic box, were taken from older tombs. The remains of the canopic box was originally inscribed for a king Sobekhotep, likely from the nearby tomb S10, now believed to belong to Sobekhotep IV.

The tomb did not house many funerary goods and may have been robbed in ancient times. Studies on his skeleton reveal he was most likely killed in battle. There are eighteen wounds on his bones, impacting his lower back, feet and ankles. The cutting angles suggest he was hit from below, perhaps while he was on a chariot or on horseback. Upon falling to the ground, he was killed by several axe blows to the skull. The curvature of the wounds on the skull indicate the use of battle axes contemporary to the Second Intermediate Period.

See also

 List of pharaohs

References

17th-century BC Pharaohs
Pharaohs of the Sixteenth Dynasty of Egypt
2014 archaeological discoveries
2nd-millennium BC births
2nd-millennium BC deaths
Pharaohs of the Abydos Dynasty
Monarchs killed in action
Axe murder